The 2017 AFC Beach Soccer Championship was a beach soccer tournament which took place between 4–11 March 2017 in Malaysia. The tournament was originally scheduled for 21–29 January 2017, but was postponed. The top three teams qualified for the 2017 FIFA Beach Soccer World Cup in the Bahamas.

Participating teams and draw
The following 14 teams entered the tournament. Myanmar initially entered but decided to withdraw prior to the draw.

 (hosts)
 (withdrew)

The draw of the tournament was held on 10 January 2017, 15:00 UTC+8, at the AFC House in Kuala Lumpur, Malaysia. The 13 teams were drawn into one group of five teams and two groups of four teams. The teams were seeded according to their results in the 2015 AFC Beach Soccer Championship.

Group stage
Each team earns three points for a win in regulation time, two points for a win in extra time, one point for a win in a penalty shoot-out, and no points for a defeat. The winners from each group and the best runner-up advance to the semi-finals.

Uzbekistan withdrew in the days prior to the start of the group stage.

All times are local, MYT (UTC+8).

Group A

Group B

Group C

Ranking of second-placed teams
To ensure equality in comparing the group runners-up, the matches against the fourth-placed and fifth-placed teams in Group A and the match against the fourth-placed team in Group C are discarded.

Knockout stage

Bracket
The semi-final matchups are determined by the identity of the best runner-up:
If best runner-up from Group A: Winner Group A vs. Winner Group C; Winner Group B vs. Runner-up Group A
If best runner-up from Group B: Winner Group A vs. Winner Group B; Winner Group C vs. Runner-up Group B
If best runner-up from Group C: Winner Group C vs. Winner Group B; Winner Group A vs. Runner-up Group C

Semi-finals
Winners qualify for 2017 FIFA Beach Soccer World Cup.

Third place match
Winner qualifies for 2017 FIFA Beach Soccer World Cup.

Final

Awards

Winners

Individual awards
The following awards were given at the conclusion of the tournament.

Top goalscorers
12 goals

 Mohammad Ali Mokhtari

11 goals

 Takasuke Goto

9 goals

 Raof Qaderi
 Farid Boulokbashi

8 goals

 Takaaki Oba

7 goals

 Moslem Mesigar
 Takuya Akaguya
 Ozu Moreira

6 goals

 Ali Nazem
 Mohamad Merhi

Final ranking

Summary

Qualified teams for FIFA Beach Soccer World Cup
The following three teams from AFC qualified for the 2017 FIFA Beach Soccer World Cup.

1 Bold indicates champion for that year. Italic indicates host for that year.

References

External links
, the-AFC.com
AFC Beach Soccer Championship 2017  at Beachsoccer.com
AFC Beach Soccer Championship 2017, stats.the-AFC.com
Technical Report and Statistics, the AFC

Qualification AFC
2017
2017 in beach soccer
2017 in Asian football